Cowden railway station is on the  branch of the Oxted line in southern England and serves Cowden in Kent. The station is managed by Southern.

History
The station was opened by the London, Brighton and South Coast Railway on 1 October 1888. It passed onto the Southern Railway in 1923 and to British Railways in 1948.

The station was destaffed in the 1990s. When the line was singled in 1990 the "up" platform was taken out of use and all trains now use the former "down" platform. The track is not electrified, so only diesel or steam trains can run.

In 1994 a serious accident occurred just south of the station.

Facilities
Cowden station is unstaffed and tickets must be bought from the self-service ticket machine at the station. 

The station has passenger help points and covered seating areas available on its platform. The station also has a small car park and cycle rack at the station entrance.

Step free access is available to the platform at Cowden.

Services
All services at Cowden are operated by Southern using  DMUs.

The typical off-peak service in trains per hour is:
 1 tph to  via 
 1 tph to 
 
Services increase to 2 tph in each direction during the peak hours.
 
On Sundays, the northbound service runs as far as Oxted only.

References

External links 

 Disused Railway Stations - Cowden

Buildings and structures in Sevenoaks District
Railway stations in Kent
Former London, Brighton and South Coast Railway stations
Railway stations in Great Britain opened in 1888
Railway stations served by Govia Thameslink Railway